Valdez TV is a Venezuelan community television channel.  It was created in April 2005 and can be seen in the community of Güiria in the Valdez Municipality of the Sucre State of Venezuela on UHF channel 23.  Marcos Vargas is the legal representative of the foundation that owns this channel.

Valdez TV does not have a website.

See also
List of Venezuelan television channels

Television networks in Venezuela
Television stations in Venezuela
Mass media in Venezuela